Apatelodes nina is a species of moth, in the genus Apatelodidae. It is found in French Guiana and Suriname.

References

External links
Natural History Museum Lepidoptera generic names catalog

Apatelodidae
Moths described in 1780
Moths of South America